Joe Balass (born in Baghdad, Iraq) is an Iraqi Canadian filmmaker. He is gay.

Of Jewish heritage, Balass is most known for Nana, George and Me, which is an autobiographical video by a young, gay Iraqi Jewish filmmaker who takes a charmingly unconventional look at three Iraqi Jewish lives; that of the filmmaker, his 92-year-old Nana and his 73-year-old friend, George. It was screened at the Castro Theatre.

Balass escaped from Iraq with his family at age four, and eventually settled in Canada. He has previously worked as a freelance editor, photographer and producer.
He has directed a number of short films and videos including;  Tattoo Needle Pricks, On a Very Violet Night in the Apartements Daphne, Nana, George & me, which won a Télé-Québec Award at the Rendez-vous du cinéma québécois (RVCQ) in Montreal, and The Devil in the Holy Water.

His 2008 film Baghdad Twist is a National Film Board of Canada documentary about the disappearance of Iraq's Jewish community though his own family's history. The filmmaker's mother recounts their family's experiences, and the film is illustrated with Balass family home movies and photos and rare archival footage from Iraq.

In 2012, he directed his second feature doc, "JOY! Portrait of a Nun" featuring Sister Missionary Position Delight, one of the founders of the Sisters of Perpetual Indulgence.

In 2013, he directed the documentary La longueur de l'alphabet avec Naïm Kattan about the Canadian writer of Iraqi Jewish origin Naïm Kattan.

In 2014, he was honoured with a retrospective at the Cinémathèque québécoise.

Filmography
1998 - Nana, George and Me
2002 - The Devil in the Holy Water
2006 - Derniers mots/Parting Words
2007 - Baghdad Twist
2012 - JOY! Portrait of a Nun
2013 - La longueur de l'alphabet avec Naïm Kattan

References

External links
 
 Official Site of "Nana, George and Me"
 Watch Baghdad Twist  at the National Film Board of Canada

Living people
Iraqi documentary film directors
Iraqi emigrants to Canada
Iraqi Jews
Canadian gay writers
LGBT film directors
Iraqi LGBT people
People from Baghdad
Canadian documentary film directors
Gay Jews
Canadian gay artists
Gay screenwriters
Canadian LGBT screenwriters
Canadian people of Iraqi-Jewish descent
Canadian documentary film producers
Year of birth missing (living people)
Jewish Canadian filmmakers
20th-century Canadian screenwriters
21st-century Canadian screenwriters
Canadian male screenwriters
21st-century Canadian LGBT people
20th-century Canadian LGBT people